During the 1918–19 Scottish football season, Celtic competed in the Scottish First Division.

Results

Scottish First Division

See also
 1919 Victory Cup

References

Scottish football championship-winning seasons
Celtic F.C. seasons
Celtic